Dinara Nurdbayeva (born 24 July 1976) is an Uzbekistani former competitive ice dancer. With her skating partner, Muslim Sattarov, she represented Uzbekistan at the 1994 Winter Olympics in Lillehammer, placing 21st in the ice dance category.

Competitive highlights 
 with Sattarov

References 

1976 births
Figure skaters at the 1994 Winter Olympics
Living people
Olympic figure skaters of Uzbekistan
Sportspeople from Tashkent
Uzbekistani female ice dancers
Dancers from Tashkent